Rekonen is a Finnish surname. Notable people with the surname include:

Aleksi Rekonen (born 1993), Finnish ice hockey player
Heimo Rekonen (1920–1997), Finnish politician

See also
Reponen

Finnish-language surnames